Melana Surovtseva (born 13 January 2003) is a Belarusian footballer who plays as a forward for Belarusian Premier League club FC Minsk and the Belarus women's national team.

Club career
Surovtseva has played for ABFF U19 and Minsk in Belarus.

International career
Surovtseva capped for Belarus at senior level during the UEFA Women's Euro 2022 qualifying.

References

2003 births
Living people
Belarusian women's footballers
Women's association football forwards
FC Minsk (women) players
Belarus women's international footballers